Ingjald Nissen (2 September 1896, Kristiania – 25 February 1977, Bærum) was a Norwegian psychologist and philosopher.

Nissen published around twenty books, and was a government scholar from 1938. His books treated a number of fundamental human questions such as sexuality, mass psychology, power hunger and the feeling of guilt. His most popular book was Psykopatenes diktatur from 1945, an effort to discuss the German catastrophe. He was a member of the Norwegian Association for Women's Rights.

See also
Master suppression techniques

References

1896 births
1977 deaths
Psychologists from Oslo
Norwegian government scholars
Norwegian Association for Women's Rights people
20th-century psychologists
20th-century Norwegian philosophers